Ease of doing business ranking of states and union territories of India is the annual ease of doing business (EDB) index of states and union territories of India based on the completion percentage scores of action items points of annual Business Reforms Action Plan (BRAP) under the Make in India initiative. This ranking of states has been done by World Bank since 2015 and facilitated by the Department for Promotion of Industry and Internal Trade (DPIIT), under the Ministry of Commerce and Industry (India) of Government of India based on the progress of states in completing annual reform action plan covering 8 key areas which has a number of points that vary every year, for example 2017 and 2016 reform plan had 372 and 340 action points respectively. The World Bank ranks individual nations on the ease of doing business index. The ranking of states is not done on same criteria as ranking of nations. Ranking of states does not reflect the level of business-conducive nature of the states, it reflects the willingness of states to reform and attract investments.

India jumped to 100th place out of 190 countries in the World Bank's 2017 ease of doing business index, from 130th in the 2016. In February 2017, the government appointed the United Nations Development Programme (UNDP) and the National Productivity Council "to sensitise actual users and get their feedback on various reform measures". Consequently, now there is competition among the Indian states to improve their current ranking on the ease of doing business index. Centre government as well as various states are executing their respective Business Reforms Action Plan (BRAP) to improve their ranking.

Methodology 

In December 2014, Chief Secretaries of states and union territories finalized the basis on which states would be ranked and scored in EDB. 98-points would be evaluated for each state. Accordingly, the first EDB report was constructed with regard to the 98 points and the respective implementation in each state.

The latest rankings released on 5 September 2020 are based on the performance of states on a wide ranging list of 181 reform points drawn up by the government. This covers 45 business regulatory areas which were used to assess the efficacy and energy of their reforms. These included single window system, inspection enablers, paying taxes, utility permits, and environment, among others. However, the biggest were access to information and transparency enablers, labour regulation-enablers and construction permit enablers. The final ranking is based on two separate scoring systems with the majority of the assessment conducted on the basis of states providing evidence of reforms in policies and procedures undertaken by them.

2015-2019 EDB ranks and scores 
The following ranks and scores are based on Department of Industrial Policy and Promotion (Department for Promotion of Industry and Internal Trade) figures, Government of India.

Best states for various areas of assessment 2015

Top five states for various areas of assessment 2015

See also 

 Complementary initiatives
 Act East policy
 Digital India
 Make in India
 My Gov (India)
 Related concepts 
 Brand India
 India Inc. 
 List of companies of India

References

Citations

External links

 
List of Global Development Indexes and Rankings

States and union territories of India-related lists
Lists of subdivisions of India
India
Economy of India lists